Ilian Vassilev (born July 7, 1956) is a Bulgarian diplomat, writer, and political blogger. He was President of the Bulgarian Foreign Investment Agency from 1997 to 2000, the Ambassador Extraordinary and Plenipotentiary of the Republic of Bulgaria to the Russian Federation from 2000 to 2006,
following which he became Chairman of Deloitte in Bulgaria. At present he is Managing Partner of his own consulting company Innovative Energy Solutions. He is Chairman of the Reform Union Club (RUC) and Honorary Chair of the Bulgarian Economic Forum since its Foundation in 1997. Ilian Vassilev also coordinates the Sofia Business School, a joint undertaking of the RUC and the New Bulgarian University. He has served as advisor on energy related matters to succeeding Bulgarian governments and appears as a regular energy security commentator for western news outlets, including the Financial Times, Reuters, and others.

Energy security activism
Since leaving Deloitte in 2011 to found his own management consulting company, Innovative Energy Solutions, Vassilev has been an outspoken energy security activist, supporting the development of shale gas fields in Bulgaria, construction of the Nabucco pipeline project, and commentator regarding the viability of the Belene NPP, and the South Stream project.

Political and social activism
Ilian Vassilev has built a reputation as a critic of corruption. He has been vocal about the fact that Bulgaria's Prosecution acts like a "baseball bat" and attacks those who criticize the status quo. He has expressed worries that Bulgaria's General Prosecutor Sotir Tsatsarov continuously exceeds his powers under Bulgaria's Constitution and acts like a hub spreading Russian influence in Europe. Ilian Vassilev has also raised concern about Bulgaria's practices of corporate-raiding and political repressions. In a commentary on his popular blog, he famously said: "You are an owner until Borisov and Peevski decide so." Recently, he underscored that the unexpected dismissal of an established journalist was an example of the authoritarian tendencies in Bulgaria.

Bibliography
 
 Kjell Engelbrekt and Ilian Vassilev, European Energy Policy Meets Russian Bilateralism: The Case of South Eastern Europe in Russia and Europe Building Bridges, Digging Trenches, Routledge, 2010

See also
 Embassy of Bulgaria in Moscow

References

External links

Official sites
 Ilian Vassilev's English Blog
 Ilian Vassilev's Business Blog
 Ilian Vassilev's Bulgarian Blog
 Ilian Vassilev's Twitter
 Innovative Energy Solutions

1956 births
Living people
Bulgarian writers
Bulgarian bloggers
Bulgarian businesspeople
University of National and World Economy alumni